Public primary and secondary education in Bartow, Florida is operated by the Polk County School Board.  Polk County Schools operates 3 high schools, 2 middle schools and  elementary schools within Bartow.

Schools
Schools in Polk County, Florida
Bartow